In the African Great Lakes region, the clan is a unit of social organisation. It is the oldest societal structure in the region, other than family and direct lineage. The structure is found in modern-day Rwanda, Burundi, Tanzania and Uganda.

Etymology 
The term clan was first used in the nineteenth century by Europeans, due to the similarities to other clan systems found across the world. The people of the area use a variety of vernacular terms to describe the concept: ubwoko in Rwanda, umuryango  in Burundi, ruganda in the Bunyoro and Buhaya kingdoms, igise in Buha, ishanja in Buhavu and ebika in Buganda.

Description 
Clan membership is a loose concept, with the correlation to lineage based more on oral tradition and personal belief than on concrete evidence. Clan members have dispersed over time, and are no longer associated with particular regions. Clans differ somewhat in their nature from country to country: in Rwanda the clan is a very structured unit, with twenty in total, themselves divided into subclans. The same holds in Nkore, which has only four clans.

Notes

References

 

Clans
History of Africa